Antonio Smith may refer to:

 Antonio Smith (artist) (1832–1877), Chilean landscape painter and caricaturist
 Antonio Smith (basketball), university basketball player from Flint, Michigan
 Antonio Smith (cornerback) (born 1984), American football cornerback
 Antonio Smith (defensive end) (born 1981), American football defensive end
 Antonio Arnelo Smith, involved in an alleged police brutality incident in Valdosta, Georgia, in 2020

See also
Tony Smith (disambiguation)